Nicolás Niverge Nynkeu (born 14 December 1982, in Douala) is a Cameroonian footballer who plays as a midfielder for the German club FC Germania Neureut.
Nynkeu started his career with local club AS Babimbi in 2000, before signing for Bosnian side Kiseljak in 2003. After spending a year as a player at Kiseljak, Nynkeu moved to Žepče, where he first started playing professionally. In July 2006 he left for Croatian lower level side Junak Sinj, where he stayed for six months and then had spells with NK Croatia Sesvete and Hrvatski Dragovoljac before joining Slaven Belupo in July 2008. In 2011 Nynkeu moved to Vinogradar.

Since early 2017, Nynkeu has been playing for FC Germania Neureut, achieving promotion with them to the eighth tier of German football in 2018.

References

1982 births
Footballers from Douala
Living people
Cameroonian footballers
Association football midfielders
NK Junak Sinj players
NK Croatia Sesvete players
NK Hrvatski Dragovoljac players
NK Slaven Belupo players
NK Vinogradar players
NK Međimurje players
Croatian Football League players
Cameroonian expatriate footballers
Expatriate footballers in Bosnia and Herzegovina
Expatriate footballers in Croatia
Expatriate footballers in Germany
Cameroonian expatriate sportspeople in Croatia
Cameroonian expatriate sportspeople in Germany